The 1952 Star World Championship was held in Cascais, Portugal in 1952.

Results

References

Star World Championships
1952 in sailing
Sailing competitions in Portugal
1952 in Portuguese sport